Mukasipidariyur is a census town in Erode district in the Indian state of Tamil Nadu.

Demographics
 India census, Mukasipidariyur had a population of 11,045. Males constitute 50% of the population and females 50%. Mukasipidariyur has an average literacy rate of 62%, higher than the national average of 59.5%: male literacy is 73%, and female literacy is 51%. In Mukasipidariyur, 9% of the population is under 6 years of age.

References

Villages in Erode district